Olaf Bertram Løhre (31 December 1877 – 5 May 1957) was a Norwegian politician.

He was born in Strinda to farmer and teacher Johan Peter Eriksen Løhre and Karen Nicoline Nilsdatter. He was elected representative to the Storting for the period 1922–1924, for the Labour Party, and the period 1928–1930, for the Communist Party.

References

1877 births
1957 deaths
Politicians from Trondheim
Labour Party (Norway) politicians
Communist Party of Norway politicians
Members of the Storting